John Ray (1816 - 1888) was an influential lawyer and politician in Louisiana. He served in the state house in 1844 and the state senate in 1850. He was elected to the U.S. Congress after the war but was prevented from taking office. Rayville, Louisiana is named for him.

He was a Whig and then a Republican. James Ray was his brother.

References

External links
Findagrave entry

1816 births
1888 deaths
Louisiana state senators
Members of the Louisiana House of Representatives
Louisiana Whigs
Louisiana Republicans